Paracerella is a genus of proturans in the family Acerentomidae.

Species
 Paracerella americana Imadaté, 1980
 Paracerella shirataki (Imadaté, 1964)

References

Protura